I Heard It Today is the third solo studio album by American hip hop artist Mr. Lif. It was released by Bloodbot Tactical Enterprises on April 21, 2009. Written at "the dawn of the Obama administration", the album is "dedicated to capturing the pulse of a tumultuous era in the United States."

Critical reception

At Metacritic, which assigns a weighted average score out of 100 to reviews from mainstream critics, the album received an average score of 70, based on 11 reviews, indicating "generally favorable reviews".

Max Herman of XLR8R gave the album an 8.5 out of 10, commenting that "taking a break from working with El-P actually benefits him, as the melodic beats crafted by producers like J-Zone, Edan, and Headnodic are the perfect pairing for Lif's selfless lyricism." Andrew Martin of PopMatters gave the album 6 stars out of 10, calling it "one of Lif's most concise and well-rounded efforts." David Aaron of BBC wrote, "it's comforting to know there are still hip hop acts out there trying to give a voice to the voiceless."

Track listing

References

External links
 

2009 albums
Mr. Lif albums
Albums produced by J-Zone